Romilly James Heald Jenkins (1907 – 30 September 1969) was a British scholar in Byzantine and Modern Greek studies. He occupied the prestigious seat of Koraes Professor of Modern Greek and Byzantine History, Language and Literature at King's College London, in 1946–1960.

Life 
Jenkins was born in Hitchin, Hertfordshire. He studied Classics at school, and then went to Greece as a student in the British School at Athens, from 1930 to 1934. There he served as  assistant director, and since 1936 as a member of the Board of the Managing Committee; 1948 he was named a trustee, and from 1951 to 1958 he served as Chairman of the Managing Committee. From 1936 to 1946 he was Lewis Gibson Lecturer in Modern Greek at the University of Cambridge. During World War II he served with the British Foreign Service. In 1946 he was appointed Koraes Professor of Modern Greek and Byzantine History, Language and Literature at King’s College London, as well as Honorary Lecturer in Classical Archaeology. Since 1960 until his death he was Professor of Byzantine History and Literature at the Dumbarton Oaks institute.

Writings 
 Dedalica. A study of Dorian plastic art in the seventh century B.C. Cambridge University Press, Cambridge, 1936.
 Dionysius Solomos, the First Major Modern Greek Poet. Cambridge University Press, Cambridge, 1940. Reprint: Denise Harvey & Company, Athens, 1981.
 The Byzantine Empire on the Eve of the Crusades. Published for the Historical Association by Philip, [London], 1953.
 Richard MacGillivray Dawkins, 1871–1955, in: Proceedings of the British Academy 41 (1955) pp. 373–88.
 The Dilessi Murders: Greek Brigands and English Hostages. Longmans, London, 1961. Reprint: Prion, London, 1998, .
 The Hellenistic origins of Byzantine literature. Washington DC, 1963.
 Byzantium: The Imperial Centuries AD 610–1071. Weidenfeld & Nicolson, London, 1966. Reprint: Medieval Academy of America 1987, 
 Constantine Porphyrogenitus: De Administrando Imperio. Ed. Gyula Moravcsik, transl. Romilly James Heald Jenkins. Budapest 1949; 2nd Ed., Washington, DC, 1968, reprinted 2008, . Croatian edition: Konstantin Porfirogenet, O upravljanju carstvom, prijevod i komentari Nikola pl. Tomašić (hrvatski), R. [Romilly] J. [James] H. [Heald] Jenkins (engleski), priređivač grčkog izvornika Gyula Moravcsik, Zagreb: Dom i svijet (Biblioteka Povjesnica), 2003. .
 Studies on Byzantine history of the 9th and 10th centuries. Variorum Reprints, London, 1970, .

References

External links 
 Jenkins as Assistant Director of the BSA

1907 births
1969 deaths
British Byzantinists
People from Hitchin
Academics of King's College London
Academics of the University of Cambridge
Scholars of Medieval Greek
Scholars of Byzantine history
Scholars of Byzantine literature